Sugözü (also known as Eskiköy) is a village in the Besni District, Adıyaman Province, Turkey. The village is populated by Kurds of the Hevêdan tribe and had a population of 586 in 2021. Before the 2013 reorganisation, it was a town (belde).

References

Villages in Besni District
Kurdish settlements in Adıyaman Province